Basketball is a 2013 South Korean television series starring Do Ji-han, Lee Elijah and Jung Dong-hyun. It aired on cable channel tvN from October 21 to December 31, 2013 on Mondays and Tuesdays at 22:00 (KST) for 18 episodes.

Plot
Set during the turbulent years of the Japanese occupation until independence, and a few years before the division of Korea into North and South, the story is about aspiring basketball players from various background and their life. The drama follows the loves, conflicts, unity, and emotional victory of young athletes who cling to the sport as the bright spot in the darkness of their times.

Cast
 Do Ji-han as Kang San, protagonist who grows up in the late 1930s in a dirt-poor village, and dreams of overcoming a life of poverty and hardship by finding success as part of the national basketball team.
 Lee Elijah as Choi Shin-young, who comes from a rich family in the capital Kyeongseong (now Seoul) and attended school in Japan, after which she returns to Korea and begins working as a magazine reporter. Kang San falls in love with her despite the disparity in their social standing.
 Jung Dong-hyun as Min Chi-ho, a basketball star enjoying nationwide popularity. With his fame, he inspires pride and spirit in his compatriots in the midst of the difficulties suffered during the Japanese occupation. He and Kang San become rivals in basketball and love.
 Gong Hyung-jin as Gong Yoon-bae
 Kim Eung-soo as Choi Je-gook
 Park Ye-eun as Go Bong-soon, a maid who speaks with a Chungcheong dialect. She came to work for Shin-young's family after her family lost its land during the Japanese occupation. She has a bright character and a knack at finding realistic solutions to problems.
 Jung In-sun as Hong Byeo-ri
 Park Soon-chun as Geum-nam
 Son Beom-joon as Hwang Bok-joo
 Jin Kyung as woman from Bamsil
 Kim Bo-mi as Mi-sook
 Kim Soo-hyun as Director Kim
 Ahn Suk-hwan as Min Tae-shin
 Kang Sung-min as Oh In-soo
 Ji Il-joo as Lee Hong-ki
 Kang Kyung-hun as Hong-ki's mother
 Jung Seung-kyo as Bae Sung-won
 Han Young-soo as Yong-goo
 Park Gun as Soo-dong
 Choi Chang-kyun as So Chil-bok
 Lee Han-wi as Yoon Deok-myung
 Go In-beom as Byun Joon-pyo
 Ha Yong-jin as Takeshi
 Jo Hee-bong as one-man band
 Park Ah-sung as Poor villager
 Jang Hee-soo as Chi-ho's mother
 Yeon Min-ji as Commissioner's wife
 Jang Jae-ho as Choi Tae-young, Choi Shin-young's brother.
 Kim Hyuk as Kim Hyuk
 Ham Sung-min as Sung-min
 Lee Jung-jin as basketball player (cameo)
 Oh Ji-ho as basketball player (cameo)
 Kang Nam-gil as Byeo-ri's father (cameo)
 Ida Daussy as French journalist (cameo)

References

External links
  
 
 

TVN (South Korean TV channel) television dramas
2013 South Korean television series debuts
2013 South Korean television series endings
Korean-language television shows
South Korean sports television series
South Korean historical television series
Television series set in Korea under Japanese rule
Basketball television series